The  (French for "Unobtainable Chamber") was the first Chamber of Deputies elected after the Second Bourbon Restoration in 1815. It was dominated by Ultra-royalists who completely refused to accept the results of the French Revolution. The name was coined by King Louis XVIII of France.

The elections, held on 14 August 1815 under census suffrage and under the impact of the "White Terror", produced a heavy Ultra-royalist majority: 350 of the 402 members were Ultra-royalists.

The  voted the establishment of military provost-marshal courts and banished all of the Conventionnels who had voted for Louis XVI's execution.

Louis XVIII, confronted with rising discontent in French society, followed the counsels of the Duc de Richelieu, prime minister since September 1815, the Duke of Wellington, the British commander of the occupation troops, and the Russian ambassador Pozzo di Borgo, and dissolved the Chamber on 5 September 1816.

The subsequent elections resulted in the Ultras being temporarily replaced by the more liberal , who attempted to reconcile the Revolution's legacy with the monarchy.

See also
France in the nineteenth century
Bourbon Restoration
Cavalier Parliament

Bourbon Restoration
1815 in France
Historical legislatures in France